was a town located in Hioki District, Kagoshima Prefecture, Japan.

On November 1, 2004, Matsumoto, along with the town of Kōriyama (also from Hioki District), the town of Kiire (from Ibusuki District), and the towns of Sakurajima and Yoshida (both from Kagoshima District), was merged into the expanded city of Kagoshima and no longer exists as an independent municipality.

Timeline
1889 - The village of Kamiijūin consisted of 6 neighborhoods (north to south): Ishitani, Fukuyama, Kamitaniguchi, Irisa, Naoki and Haruyama
1960 — The village of Kamiijūin became the town of Matsumoto.
November 1, 2004 - Matsumoto, along with the towns of Kōriyama, both from Hioki District, and the towns of Sakurajima and Yoshida, both from Kagoshima District, Kiire, both from Ibusuki District, was merged into the expanded city of Kagoshima and no longer exists as an independent municipality.

Transportation

Railroad 
Kyushu passenger rail（Kyushu Railway Company）  
Kagoshima Main Line  
Satsuma-Matsumoto Station - Kami-Ijūin Station

Road

Highway  
Minami-Kyushu Expressway (Kagoshima road) Matsumoto Interchange

National highway  
Unavailable

Prefectural Road

Main Country Path   
Kagoshima prefectural road 24 Kagoshima Higashiichiki line 
Kagoshima prefectural road 35 Nagayoshi Irisa Kagoshima Line

Public Prefectural Road   
Kagoshima prefectural road 296 Kagoshima prefectural road 
Kagoshima Prefectural road 210 koyamada Taniyama line 
Kagoshima prefectural road 291 Matsumoto Kawanabe line 
Kagoshima prefectural road 296  Tanokashira Hukiage line

Schools

High school 
Shoyo High School

Junior high school 
Matsumoto Junior High School

Elementary school 
Matsumoto Elementary School
Tosho Elementary School
Haruyama Elementary School
Isihitani Elementary School

External links
 Official website of Kagoshima in Japanese

Dissolved municipalities of Kagoshima Prefecture